The 1933 World Table Tennis Championships men's doubles was the seventh edition of the men's doubles championship.
Sándor Glancz and Viktor Barna defeated Lajos Dávid and István Kelen in the final by three sets to two. Barna playing with his new doubles partner Glancz, won his fifth consecutive doubles title.

Results

See also
List of World Table Tennis Championships medalists

References

-